Westwood Country Club is a country club in Westwood, Missouri, in central St. Louis County, Missouri.

Westwood Country Club is one of the top two elite St. Louis area country clubs, along with St. Louis Country Club, and, with Old Warson Country Club and Bellerive Country Club, one of the "big four" elite St. Louis clubs. Membership is about 650 families, mostly (although no longer entirely) Jewish.

The par-72 18-hole golf course was designed by Harold Paddock and built in 1928. The course was more recently renovated under the direction of golf architect Keith Foster. There are four Har-Tru and six Deco Turf tennis courts and an Olympic-size swimming pool.

The club was founded in 1907 specifically to provide a Jewish country club for the St. Louis area, during a time when most country clubs excluded Jews from membership. It was first built in the town of Glendale. By 1927 many of the members' households had moved westward to the Central West End and the towns of Clayton and Ladue, so farmland was purchased in what is now Westwood and a new club built, with the course designed by Paddock and the clubhouse by the firm of Maritz and Young. There were, at that time, also riding stables.

The club maintains a low public profile (there is no sign at the entrance, and the address was unpublished until recently) and a refined ambiance; conducting business on the premises is frowned upon. Membership criteria remains rather selective, favoring successive generations of families.

The club was ranked 29th in the 2012 Platinum Clubs of America list of top full-service country clubs.

References

External links
Westwood Country Club website

Golf clubs and courses in Missouri
1907 establishments in Missouri
Jewish clubs and societies
Jews and Judaism in St. Louis
Buildings and structures in St. Louis County, Missouri